Walter Rudolph Doan (March 12, 1887 – October 19, 1935) was a professional baseball pitcher for the Cleveland Naps during parts of the 1909 and 1910 seasons. In his career, Doan pitched 22.2 innings and posted a 5.56 ERA.

References 

1887 births
1935 deaths
Major League Baseball pitchers
Cleveland Naps players
Baseball players from Idaho
Roanoke Tigers players
New Orleans Pelicans (baseball) players
Portland Beavers players
Venice Tigers players
Vernon Tigers players
Evansville Evas players
Moline Plowboys players
People from Bellevue, Idaho